Milam Fork is a stream in the U.S. state of West Virginia.

Milam Fork was named after one Mr. Milam, a pioneer settler.

See also
List of rivers of West Virginia

References

Rivers of Wyoming County, West Virginia
Rivers of West Virginia